The following is a timeline of the history of the city of Piacenza in the Emilia-Romagna region of Italy.

Prior to 18th century

 218 BCE - Placentia becomes a Roman colony.
 205 BCE - Placentia besieged by Carthaginian forces of Hasdrubal.
 200 BCE - Town sacked by Gaulish forces.
 187 BCE - Via Aemilia (Ariminum-Placentia road) built.
 271 CE - The Marcomanni defeat the Aurehan outside the city walls.
 375 CE - Basilica of Sant'Antonino built.
 450 CE - Roman Catholic Diocese of Piacenza established (approximate date).
 546 - "Totila reduced Piacenza by famine."
 903 - San Savino church construction begins.
 988 - Piacenza becomes an archbishopric.
 997 - Piacenza demoted to a bishopric; Emperor Otto III removes the city from the county of Piacenza and gives it to the bishop.
 1005 - Bishop Siegfried moves San Savino outside the walls and rebuilds it.
 1107 - San Savino rebuilt in a Romanesque style.
 1095 - Council of Piacenza a mixed synod of ecclesiastics and laymen.
 1122 - Piacenza Cathedral construction begins.
 1167 - Piacenza joins the Lombard League.
 1183 - Meeting of Lombard League held in Piacenza regarding the Peace of Constance.
 1226 - Piacenza joins renewed Lombard League.
 1229 - Piacenza participates in War of the Keys on the side of the pope and the Battle of San Cesario on the side of Bologna.
 1233 - Piacenza Cathedral construction completed.
 1235 - Guelph Annals of Piacenza finished.
 1254 -  in power.
 1278 - San Francesco church construction begins.
 1281 - Palazzo Comunale built.
 1334 - Sant'Anna church built.
 1400 - Public clock installed (approximate date).
 1447 - Piacenza taken by forces of Francesco I Sforza.
 1471 - Hospital built.
 1475 - Printing press in operation.
 1499 - San Sisto church construction begins.
 1512 - Piacenza "occupied by the papal forces."
 1545 - Duchy of Parma and Piacenza created under Pier Luigi Farnese, Duke of Parma.
 1558 - Palazzo Farnese construction begins.
 1620 - Statue of Ranuccio I Farnese erected in the Piazza dei Cavalli.
 1625 - Statue of Alexander Farnese erected in the Piazza dei Cavalli.

18th-19th centuries
 1738 - Austrians in power per Treaty of Vienna (1738).
 1746 - 16 June: Austrian-Sardinian and Franco-Spanish conflict fought near city.
 1748 - Spaniards in power.
 1796 - Piacenza occupied by French forces.
 1801 - Piacenza becomes part of the Kingdom of Piedmont per Treaty of Lunéville.
 1804 -  (theatre) opens.
 1811 - Biblioteca Comunale Passerini-Landi (library) established.
 1821
 Political unrest.
  (cemetery) established.
 1831 - Political unrest.
 1848 - 10 May: "Piacenza was the first Italian city to vote for union with Piedmont" during the Revolution of 1848.
 1859
 Piacenza–Bologna railway begins operating; Piacenza railway station opens.
 Piacenza becomes part of the Kingdom of Piedmont.
  (provincial district) established.
 1860 - Alessandria–Piacenza railway begins operating.
 1861 - Population: 40,582.(it)
 1867 - Progresso newspaper begins publication.
 1883 - Libertà newspaper begins publication.

20th century

 1902 -  begins operating.
 1903 - Museo Civico (museum) founded.
 1911 - Population: 38,542.
 1919 - Piacenza Football Club formed.
 1920 -  (stadium) opens.
 1932 -  (railway) begins operating.
 1933 - Piacenza–Cremona railway begins operating.
 1936 - Population: 64,210.(it)
 1961 - Population: 88,541.(it)
 1969 - Stadio Leonardo Garilli (stadium) opens.
 1981 - Population: 109,039.(it)
 1994 - Local election held;  (center-left) becomes Mayor. He is the first Mayor elected by direct vote in the history of Piacenza.
 1995 - Local election held;  (center-left) is elected President of the Province of Piacenza. He is the first President elected by direct vote in the history of Piacenza.
 1998 - Local election held; the lawyer  (center-right) becomes Mayor. He is the first Mayor of the center-right coalition elected by direct vote in the history of Piacenza. The incumbent Mayor Giacomo Vaciago is the first Mayor to not run for a second final term.
 1999 - Local election held;  (center-left) is elected re-President of the Province of Piacenza.

21st century
 2000 - La Cronaca newspaper begins publication.
 2002 - Local election held;  (center-left) becomes Mayor. The incumbent Mayor Gianguido Guidotti is the first Mayor to lost a run-off in the direct vote.
 2004 - Local election held; Gian Luigi Boiardi (center-left) is elected President of the Province of Piacenza. 
 2007 - Local election held; Roberto Reggi (center-left) is re-elected Mayor. He is the first incumbent Mayor re-elected by direct vote.
 2008 - Museo civico di storia naturale di Piacenza (museum) opens in the Fabbrica del Ghiaccio.
 2009 - Local election held;  is elected President of the Province of Piacenza. He is the first President of the center-right elected by direct vote in the history of Piacenza. The incumbent Mayor Gianluigi Boiardi is the first President to lost at the first round in the direct vote.
 2012 - Local election held; Paolo Dosi (center-left) becomes Mayor.
 2013
 Piacenza–Cremona railway closed.
 Population: 100,843.
 2017 - Local election held; the lawyer Patrizia Barbieri (center-right) becomes Mayor. She is the first female Mayor elected by direct vote in the history of Piacenza. The incumbent Mayor Paolo Dosi is the second Mayor to not run for a second final term.

See also
 Piacenza history
 
 List of mayors of Piacenza
 List of counts of Piacenza, 8th-11th centuries
 List of bishops of Piacenza
  (state archives)

Timelines of other cities in the macroregion of Northeast Italy:(it)
 Emilia-Romagna region: Timeline of Bologna; Ferrara; Forlì; Modena; Parma; Ravenna; Reggio Emilia; Rimini
 Friuli-Venezia Giulia region: Timeline of Trieste
 Trentino-South Tyrol region: Timeline of Trento
 Veneto region: Timeline of Padua; Treviso; Venice; Verona; Vicenza

References

This article incorporates information from the Italian Wikipedia.

Bibliography

in English

in Italian
  1757-1766 (12 volumes)
 v.11
 
 
 
  (bibliography)
 
 
  circa 1980-2002 (6 volumes)

External links

 Items related to Piacenza, various dates (via Europeana)
 Items related to Piacenza, various dates (via Digital Public Library of America)

Piacenza
Piacenza
piacenza